Storm Lodge is a large bungalow (as mansions are referred to locally) in Colombo, Sri Lanka. Its owned by the Colombo Swimming Club, 142 Galle Road, Colombo-03.

External links
Colombo Swimming Club website

Houses in Colombo